The Canton of Le Boussin-de-Cadouin is a former canton of the Dordogne département, in France. It was disbanded following the French canton reorganisation which came into effect in March 2015. It consisted of 8 communes, which joined the canton of Lalinde in 2015. It had 3,849 inhabitants (2012).

The lowest point is 35 m in the commune of Badefols-sur-Dordogne, the highest point is in Le Buisson-de-Cadouin at 248 m, the average elevation is 85 m.  The most populated commune was Le Buisson-de-Cadouin with 2,086 inhabitants (2012).

Communes
The canton comprised the following communes:

Alles-sur-Dordogne
Badefols-sur-Dordogne
Bouillac
Le Buisson-de-Cadouin
Calès
Molières
Pontours
Urval

Population history

See also 
 Cantons of the Dordogne department

References

Former cantons of Dordogne
2015 disestablishments in France
States and territories disestablished in 2015